Hangin' Out is an album by jazz trumpeters Joe Newman and Joe Wilder recorded in 1984 and released on the Concord Jazz label.

Reception

The Allmusic review by Scott Yanow stated: "the results are swinging, lyrical, melodic and well-balanced".

Track listing
 "The Midgets" (Joe Newman) – 4:49
 "Here's That Rainy Day" (Jimmy Van Heusen, Johnny Burke) – 4:01	
 "Duet" (Neal Hefti) – 4:12
 "Battle Hymn of the Republic" (Traditional) – 6:08
 "Secret Love" (Sammy Fain, Paul Francis Webster) – 5:09
 "You've Changed" (Bill Carey, Carl Fischer) – 5:37
 "'Lypso Mania" (Frank Foster) – 4:39
 "He Was Too Good to Me" (Richard Rodgers, Lorenz Hart) – 4:05

Personnel
Joe Newman – trumpet
Joe Wilder – trumpet, flugelhorn 
Hank Jones – piano
Rufus Reid – bass 
Marvin "Smitty" Smith – drums

References

Concord Records albums
Joe Newman (trumpeter) albums
Joe Wilder albums
1984 albums
Albums produced by Carl Jefferson